Batmanning may refer to:
Inversion therapy in unusual places or through unusual means
A planking variant